Amblyodipsas dimidiata, or the Mpwapwa purple-glossed snake, is a species of venomous rear-fanged snake in the Atractaspididae family.

Geographic range
It is endemic to northern Tanzania.

Description
The snake is black dorsally; white ventrally, and is also colored white on the upper lip, and on three lower rows of dorsal scales on each side.

The rostral is very large, with a portion visible from above longer than its distance from the frontal; the internasals are more than twice as broad as they are long. The supraoculars are very small. The snake has six upper labials, the third in contact with the nasal and the prefrontal, the third and fourth entering the eye, and the fifth largest and in contact with the parietal.

The dorsal scales are smooth, without pits, arranged in 17 rows. Ventrals 192–215; anal divided; subcaudals 20–27, divided.

References

Atractaspididae
Snakes of Africa
Reptiles of Tanzania
Endemic fauna of Tanzania
Reptiles described in 1888
Taxa named by Albert Günther